Section 39 of the Constitution of Australia provides that the quorum of the Australian House of Representatives shall be one third of the total number of members, until the Parliament otherwise provides.

During the Convention debates in Adelaide, Joseph Carruthers suggested that one third was too high and suggested that a quorum of twenty would be sufficient, but his suggestion was rejected.

With the passage of the House of Representatives (Quorum) Act 1989, the Parliament has changed the quorum to one fifth of the total number of members, which with the current House of Representatives size of 150 means that at least 30 members are required for a quorum.

See also
 Section 22 of the Constitution of Australia

References

Australian constitutional law